

Peerage of England 

|Earl of Northampton (1080)||Simon Saint-Lis, 3rd Earl of Northampton||1153||1184|| 
|-
|Earl of Surrey (1088)||Isabel de Warenne, 4th Countess of Surrey||1148||1199|| 
|-
|Earl of Warwick (1088)||William de Beaumont, 3rd Earl of Warwick||1153||1184|| 
|-
|Earl of Buckingham (1097)||Walter Giffard, 2nd Earl of Buckingham||1102||1164||Died
|-
|rowspan=2|Earl of Devon (1141)||Richard de Redvers, 2nd Earl of Devon||1155||1162||Died
|-
|Baldwin de Redvers, 3rd Earl of Devon||1162||1188|| 
|-
|rowspan=2|Earl of Leicester (1107)||Robert de Beaumont, 2nd Earl of Leicester||1118||1168||Died
|-
|Robert de Beaumont, 3rd Earl of Leicester||1168||1190|| 
|-
|Earl of Chester (1121)||Hugh de Kevelioc, 3rd Earl of Chester||1153||1181|| 
|-
|Earl of Gloucester (1121)||William Fitzrobert, 2nd Earl of Gloucester||1147||1183|| 
|-
|Earl of Hertford (1135)||Roger de Clare, 3rd Earl of Hertford||1151||1173|| 
|-
|Earl of Richmond (1136)||Conan IV, Duke of Brittany||1146||1171|| 
|-
|Earl of Arundel (1138)||William d'Aubigny, 1st Earl of Arundel||1138||1176|| 
|-
|rowspan=2|Earl of Derby (1138)||Robert de Ferrers, 2nd Earl of Derby||1139||1162||Died
|-
|William de Ferrers, 3rd Earl of Derby||1162||1190|| 
|-
|Earl of Pembroke (1138)||Richard de Clare, 2nd Earl of Pembroke||1147||1176|| 
|-
|rowspan=2|Earl of Essex (1139)||Geoffrey de Mandeville, 2nd Earl of Essex||1144||1160||Died
|-
|William de Mandeville, 3rd Earl of Essex||1160||1189|| 
|-
|Earl of Norfolk (1140)||Hugh Bigod, 1st Earl of Norfolk||1140||1177|| 
|-
|Earl of Cornwall (1141)||Reginald de Dunstanville, 1st Earl of Cornwall||1141||1175|| 
|-
|Earl of Oxford (1142)||Aubrey de Vere, 1st Earl of Oxford||1142||1194|| 
|-
|rowspan=2|Earl of Salisbury (1145)||Patrick of Salisbury, 1st Earl of Salisbury||1145||1168||Died
|-
|William of Salisbury, 2nd Earl of Salisbury||1168||1196|| 
|-
|Earl of Buckingham (1164)||Richard de Clare, 2nd Earl of Pembroke||1164||1176||New creation; also the Earl of Buckingham.

Peerage of Scotland

|Earl of Mar (1114)||Morggán, Earl of Mar||Abt. 1140||Abt. 1178||
|-
|rowspan=2|Earl of Dunbar (1115)||Gospatric III, Earl of Dunbar||1138||1166||Died
|-
|Waltheof, Earl of Dunbar||1166||1182||
|-
|Earl of Angus (1115)||Gille Brigte, Earl of Angus||1135||1187||
|-
|Earl of Atholl (1115)||Máel Coluim, Earl of Atholl||Abt 1150||Abt 1190||
|-
|Earl of Buchan (1115)||Colbán, Earl of Buchan||Abt. 1135||Abt. 1180||
|-
|Earl of Strathearn (1115)||Ferchar, Earl of Strathearn||Abt. 1140||1171||
|-
|Earl of Fife (1129)||Donnchad II, Earl of Fife||1154||1203||
|-
|Earl of Ross (1157)||Malcolm MacHeth, Earl of Ross||1157||1168||Died
|-
|Earl of Menteith (1160)||Gille Críst, Earl of Menteith||Abt. 1160||Abt. 1190||
|-
|}

References

 

Lists of peers by decade
1160s in England
12th century in Scotland
12th-century English people
12th-century mormaers
Peers